Mosrite is an American guitar manufacturing company, based in Bakersfield, California, from the late 1950s to the early 1990s. Founded by Semie Moseley, Mosrite guitars were played by many rock and roll and country artists.

Mosrite guitars were known for innovative design, high-quality engineering, very thin, low-fretted and narrow necks (though Mosrite used taller frets and wider necks after the 1960s,) and extremely hot (high output) pickups. Moseley's design for The Ventures, known as "the Ventures model" (later known as the "Mark I") was generally considered to be the flagship of the line.
Mosrite also made a small number of acoustic guitars;  The Serenade model, and four Balladere models, including one 12 string.

History

Apprenticeship

Semie Moseley started playing guitar in an evangelical group in Bakersfield, California, at age 13. He and his brother Andy experimented with guitars from their teen-age years, refinishing instruments and building new necks.

Semie began building guitars in the Los Angeles area around 1952 or 1953, apprenticing at the Rickenbacker factory.  There he learned much of his guitar making skills from Roger Rossmeisl, a German immigrant who brought old-world luthier techniques into the modern electric guitar manufacturing process. One of the most recognizable features on most Mosrite guitars is the "German Carve" on the top that Moseley learned from Rossmeisl. During the same time, Moseley apprenticed with Paul Bigsby in Downey, California, the man who made the first modern solid-body guitar for Merle Travis in 1948, and who invented the Bigsby vibrato tailpiece, which is still used today.

Mosrite founded
In 1954, Semie built a triple-neck guitar in his garage (the longest neck was a standard guitar, the second-longest neck an octave higher, the shortest was an eight-string mandolin.) He presented a double-neck to Joe Maphis, a Los Angeles-area TV performer of country music. He also made several similar twin-neck guitars (with the performer's name inlaid into the neck) for Maphis' protegé, the child prodigy guitarist Larry Collins, who still owns his three Mosrite twin-necks. By 1956, with an investment from Ray Boatright, a local Los Angeles Foursquare Gospel minister, Semie and Andy started their company, Mosrite of California. In gratitude to Reverend Boatright, Moseley named the company by combining his and Boatright's last names; the name is properly pronounced MOZE-rite, based on the pronunciation Semie Moseley used for his own name. Semie, who built guitars for the L.A.-based Rickenbacker company, told his co-workers that he was making his own product and was fired by Rickenbacker.

When they began, their production was all custom, handmade guitars, built in garages, tin storage sheds, wherever the Moseleys could put equipment.

In 1959, Andy moved to Nashville, Tennessee, for a year to popularize the Mosrite name and sold a few, including to Grand Ole Opry entertainers and road musicians. Andy said: "And that’s how we kept the factory going at the time: custom guitars".

Moseley made guitars in Los Angeles until 1959, when he moved to Oildale, California, just north of Bakersfield. In 1962, he moved his shop to Panama Lane where he designed and produced the first Joe Maphis model guitars, one model of which would eventually evolve into the "Ventures model" guitar and bass (Joe Maphis would later get a model of his own, similar to a Mosrite Combo model but without the F-hole). At this time, Mosrite made everything in-house, except for the tuners.

Mosrite pickups after the 50s usually came in several ways through Mosrite's history, none with metal casing; 1: the large single coil similar to (but not as long as) a P90, 2: a cheaper version of the first pickup that showed on cheaper models (Celebrity III, Mark V,) 3: a cheaper pickup only found on the first iteration of the Ventures II and 4: a Mosrite Humbucker mostly found on some 1970s models.

The full "The Ventures" line consisted of "the Ventures model" (as several versions: a 6 String Guitar, 4 String Bass, and 12 String Guitar - the "Mark I," "Mark X," and "Mark XII" versions, respectively,) "the Ventures II model" (of several versions,) and "the Ventures Mark V model." "The Ventures" line started in 1963 and ran through 1967 or 1968 when the licensing agreement with The Ventures ended.

At the peak of production, in 1968, Mosrite was making around 600 guitars per month.

Bankruptcy and restart
Mosrite of California went bankrupt in late 1968 after they contracted with the Thomas Organ Company to market their guitars. After this, they tried to deal directly with stores, and they sold 280 guitars in 1969 before they came to the shop one day in February and found their doors pad-locked. Two years after his bankruptcy, Semie was able to get back the Mosrite name, and in 1970 he started making guitars again in Pumpkin Center near Bakersfield. He moved his factory three times in the next 20 years, to Oklahoma City in the mid-1970s, to the township of Jonas Ridge, in Burke County, North Carolina, in 1981 (where a factory fire destroyed the operation,) and to Leachville, Arkansas, in 1991.  Only one guitar was produced in Leachville and is now on display at the town's Melody Theater.

Though an acknowledged genius at guitar design and construction, Moseley lacked many basic skills necessary to be a good businessman, and thus the company fell on hard times repeatedly in the late 1960s and 1970s, but continued to produce Mosrite guitars until 1993 in North Carolina and Arkansas. Most of them were exported to Japan, where their popularity remained very strong. The quality of the instruments always remained very respectable. Semie Moseley died in 1992. His wife Loretta continued to produce Mosrites a year or so after his death, and since 2008 has been selling custom Mosrites via their website.

The company now has recently released the Semie Moseley Model '63 and '65, based on the Ventures models made in those two years. Both models are made to the exact specifications as the original models; they are 100 % hand-made and were created to commemorate Semie Moseley.

Semie's daughter, Dana Moseley, is also a luthier and continues to build Mosrite guitars. She also helps kick off the monthly "Mosrite Jam" in Bakersfield.

List of models

Note that there are exceptions to this list of models where perhaps a 1960s model has white paint for the headstock logos or a 1970s 350 model has a basswood body and maple neck instead of a mahogany body and mahogany neck. Mosrite is a company where outliers aren't unheard of.

Mosrite also used other names occasionally; "Gospel" was often a name associated with guitars given away to churches although it was also used during Mosrite's bankruptcy period when they didn't have their Mosrite name (1969–1970,) Semie also used his last name "Moseley" for guitars built during the same period.

1950s
 One double neck guitar built for Joe Maphis, 
 A triple-neck guitar built for Semie Moseley personally, 
More various guitars though none in commercial production.

1960s

Pre-1963 
 Joe Maphis model — Same general body shape as the later Ventures model; This was to be Joe Maphis'  model before Semie Moseley and The Ventures settled on a contract and the body shape became the Ventures model. This is not the same as the later Joe Maphis model which is similar to the Combo model.

1963–1968 
 The Ventures Model — Also came as a bass and later on, A 12-string. Post Ventures, 1968 and 1969 it was named the "Mark I". The first Ventures Models came with a set neck, bound body and a large Ventures and Mosrite logo, less than 250 of these were made before settling on the standard Ventures Model sometime in 1964, without body binding and the neck became bolt on. The Mosrite logo and Ventures model logo were slightly reduced.
 Ventures Bass (AKA "Mark X")
 Mark XII Twelve-String Guitar — Most of these have stoptails although some have tremolos.

1965 
 The Ventures II ("Slab Body" Type) Model — Designed by Semie Moseley's brother, Andy Moseley. Only built as a six-string guitar in 1965. Came in Red, Blue, White, and Sunburst. Production started in mid-1965 and ended several months later with small production numbers not exceeding 150 (possibly under 100.) This Slab Body Model was replaced with the second Ventures II design, reportedly because Semie Moseley was disappointed in this original design, thinking it looked too cheap for Mosrite. The "Slab Body" name is not official, it was coined by Mosrite enthusiasts to differentiate the two Ventures II guitars.

This Ventures "Slab Body" is the model that Johnny Ramone of the Ramones was mostly known to play. 

1965–1966 
 The Ventures II (German Carve Body Type) Model — Replaced the earlier Ventures II; Same body design as the Mark V model. Only came as a six-string guitar. Some of these, mostly earlier models with a few exceptions, have longer pickguards than later models; the neck pickup on the long pickguard models is slightly farther from the bridge, as Mosrite was to using remaining Ventures II "Slab Body" necks, which are slightly shorter at the end (but are the same scale length.) This model was re-named the "Ventures Mark V" in 1966.

The "Ventures II German Carve" name is not official, it was coined by Mosrite enthusiasts to differentiate the two Ventures II guitars.

 1966–?
 Joe Maphis Dual Neck model— Two-necked guitar based on the Ventures model. Has 6 string and 12 string necks. Variants may exist.
 Joe Maphis models — These are similar in body shape to the later Combo model, but unlike the Combo model, these have no F-holes. They're normally painted in a natural finish. They came as:
 Mark I Six-String Guitar
 Mark X Bass
 Mark XII Twelve-String Guitar

1966–1969 
 The Ventures Mark V Model — Later just named "Mark V" after the Ventures contract ended in 1967/1968. Came in Red, White, Blue, and Sunburst, and late in production, as Candy Apple Red. Only sold as a six-string guitar commercially, although a few Bass Prototypes exist (albeit with guitar scale lengths of 24.50".) A battered 1966 Ford Blue version of this model was used by the B-52s' Ricky Wilson with only four strings and a custom tuning for some of their distinctive sound and was featured on the inner sleeve of their debut 'yellow' album. 

 Celebrity I, Celebrity II and Celebrity III Hollow-Body Guitars — came as:

 Mark I Six-String Guitar
 Mark X Bass
 Mark XII Twelve-String Guitar

 Combo Semi-Hollow Body Guitar; came as:

 Co Mark I Model 300 Six-String Guitar
 Co Mark X Model 301 4-String Bass Guitar (30 1/4" Scale Length.)
 Co Mark XII Model 302 Twelve-String Guitar

Acoustic guitars:

 Balladere 6-String Guitar Models; came as:

 Balladere I (Model 401) Six String Guitar. No binding on neck. 
 Balladere II (Model 402) Six String Guitar, 5 Inch Deep Body.
 Balladere III (Model 403) Six String Guitar with Bolt-On Neck.
 Balladere III-XII (Model 403-12) Twelve String Guitar. 

 Serenade 6-String Guitar.

1970s

Unlike 1960s models, the 1970s marked a departure from the skinny necks; Mosrite didn't always make thin necks in the 70s.

 300 (Telecaster-Style Body Shape, One pickup in the neck position, no German Carve) — Came as both six-string guitar and four-string bass. Came with a Mosrite Humbucker Pickup. Mahogany Body and Mahogany Neck.
 350 (Telecaster-Style Body Shape, Two pickups, no German Carve) — Came in both "Stereo" for two output jacks and "Mono" for one output jack. Came as six-string guitar and four-string bass. Mostly came with Mosrite Humbucker Pickups though some may exist with Mosrite single coils. Mahogany Body and Mahogany Neck, mostly (with at least one exception.)
 500 Blues Bender — Six-String Guitar similar in shape to a Gibson Les Paul but with typical Mosrite features; German Carve, Basswood body, Maple neck and Rosewood fretboard. Unlike 1960s Mosrite models, this model has a wider neck then 60s Mosrites and features Mosrite Humbucker pickups not found on stock 60s models. 
 Celebrity — Mosrite continued production of the Celebrity models into the 70s with Mosrite Humbucker pickups.
 V-I — 70s design of guitar as the Ventures and "Mark I" models, minus the Ventures logo.
 V-II or V II — Same body style as a Mark I or Ventures model but with Mosrite Humbuckers and more electronics.
 B-I — Ventures bass minus the Ventures logo.
 B-II — Ventures bass minus the Ventures logo, but with Humbuckers and more controls.
 S.M. (Semie Moseley) Model — (Unofficial Name.) Six-String Guitar similar in Les Paul-style shape, with the same outlines of the Blues Bender and Brass Rail models. These do not have a German Carve, and they have single coil pickups. 84 or fewer are estimated to have been built.
1976
 Brass Rail — Six-String Guitar similar in body shape to a Gibson Les Paul with frets attached to a brass rod in the neck for sustain. Has a German Carve.
 Brass Rail Deluxe — Came with passive and active circuits and two output jacks. Has a German Carve.

An estimate of 125 Brass Rail models are estimated to have been built with the Deluxe models being scarcer, an estimate of 12 being built.

Other Associated 1970s Guitars
 Acoustic Black Widow (Electric 6 String Guitar) — Some were built by Mosrite.
 Sooner model (Electric 6 String Guitar) — Although not under the Mosrite name, these are associated with Mosrite. They share the same tailpiece as some Brass Rail models, and the bridge is non-adjustable for intonation.

1980s

This era mostly consisted of Ventures reissues and Ventures shaped models including but not limited to:

 M88
 V88
Both similar to the Ventures guitar design.

 V63

1963 Ventures Model Reissue with a bound body and neck, output jack on the side and vibramute.

1990s
 The Nokie Model — Nokie Edwards Model; Similar to the Ventures model and with smooth pickup covers.
 The Ramones Model — Ramones Model; Similar to the 1960s Ventures model. Seen in the Ramones' "I Don't Want To Grow Up" Music Video. Has a "Sharkfin" Pickguard, stop tailpiece and one bridge pickup. Few of these were built.

Notable players

 Johnny Ramone (of the Ramones) 
 Fred "Sonic" Smith (of The MC5)
 Dave Alexander (of The Stooges)
 Michael Davis of The MC5
 Drake Levin  (of Paul Revere & The Raiders)
 Kurt Cobain (of Nirvana) 
 Jerry Cantrell (of Alice in Chains) 
 Davie Allan 
 Erik Brann (of Iron Butterfly)
 Toulouse Engelhardt 
 Glen Campbell 
 Kevin Shields (of My Bloody Valentine)
 Brian Causey (of Man or Astro-man?)
 Larry Collins (of The Collins Kids)
Lee Dorman (of Iron Butterfly)
 Art Greenhaw 
 Susumu Hirasawa 
 Johnny & The Hurricanes 
 Koichi Kawasaki 
 Yūzō Kayama 
 Joe Maphis  
 Efrim Menuck 
 C.J. Ramone (of Ramones)
 Izzy Stradlin
 Takeshi Terauchi 
 The Ventures 
 Love 
 Robert Smith (The Cure) 
 Ricky Wilson (The B-52's) 
 Kevn Kenney (Drivin N Cryin)

Notes

References

Further reading 
 Landers, Rick; Brennan, Tim, "The Story of Mosrite Guitars, Part One". Modern Guitars magazine, January 18, 2005
 Price, Robert, "The Man Behind the Mosrite" (archived 2008 copy), The Bakersfield Californian. Has biographical notes on Semie Moseley.

External links

 Official website (archived, March 12, 2013)
 Mosrite guitars on Ed Roman website
 The Mosrite Gospel guitar, North American Instruments, 2000. With some personal notes on its builder.
 "Mosrite History", Tym Guitars, Australia.
 Mosrite Guitars, "Mosrite Guitars at Front Porch Music", California
 "Mosrite Forum" (Fan site for Mosrite enthusiasts)
 "Mosrite Celebrity" (Fan site for the Mosrite Celebrity models)
 Andy Moseley Interview - NAMM Oral History Program, 2012

Guitar manufacturing companies of the United States